The Browning Version is a 1951 British drama film based on the 1948 play of the same name by Terence Rattigan. It was directed by Anthony Asquith and starred Michael Redgrave. In 1994, a remake was made starring Albert Finney.

Plot
Andrew Crocker-Harris is an ageing Classics master at an English public school, and is forced into retirement by his increasing ill health. The film, in common with the original stage play, follows the schoolmaster's final two days in his post, as he comes to terms with his sense of failure as a teacher, a sense of weakness exacerbated by his wife's infidelity and the realisation that he is despised by both pupils and staff of the school.

The emotional turning point for the cold Crocker-Harris is his pupil Taplow's unexpected parting gift, Robert Browning's translation of the Agamemnon, which he has inscribed with the Greek phrase that translates as "God from afar looks graciously upon a gentle master".

Differences between play and film
Rattigan extends the screenplay far from his own one-act play, which ends on Crocker-Harris's tearful reaction to Taplow's gift. Therefore, the play ends well before Crocker-Harris's farewell speech to the school; the film shows the speech, in which he discards his notes and admits his failings, to be received with enthusiastic applause and cheers by the boys. The film ends with a conversation between Crocker-Harris and Taplow, and the suggestion that Crocker-Harris will complete his translation of the Agamemnon.

Cast
 Michael Redgrave as Andrew Crocker-Harris
 Jean Kent as his wife Millie
 Nigel Patrick as her lover Frank Hunter, Andrew's fellow schoolmaster who eventually rejects Millie for her cruelty towards her husband
 Ronald Howard as Gilbert, Crocker-Harris's successor
 Wilfrid Hyde-White as the Headmaster
 Brian Smith as Taplow
 Bill Travers as Fletcher
 Judith Furse as Mrs. Williamson
 Peter Jones as Carstairs
 Sarah Lawson as Betty Carstairs
 Scott Harold as Rev. Williamson
 Paul Medland as Wilson
 Ivan Samson as Lord Baxter
 Josephine Middleton as Mrs. Frobisher

Production
Rattigan and Asquith encountered a lack of enthusiasm from producers to turn the play into a film until they met Earl St John at Rank.

"I started out as manager of a small out-of-town cinema, and I viewed films from the out-of-London angle", said St John. "This experience made me realise that the ordinary people in the remotest places in the country were entitled to see the works of the best modern British playwrights."

Eric Portman originated the role on stage but turned down the film role. Margaret Lockwood was originally meant to play the role of Millie but turned down the part. Jean Kent played it instead. (Kent often stepped into roles originally envisioned for Lockwood.)

The film was shot at Pinewood Studios in 1950 and generally released in April, 1951. The school exteriors were filmed on location at Sherborne School in Sherborne, Dorset.

The Greek text that appears on the blackboard in Crocker-Harris's classroom is the Agamemnon lines 414–9:

πόθῳ δ᾽ ὑπερποντίας  
φάσμα δόξει δόμων ἀνάσσειν.  
εὐμόρφων δὲ κολοσσῶν  
ἔχθεται χάρις ἀνδρί:  
ὀμμάτων δ᾽ ἐν ἀχηνίαις  
ἔρρει πᾶσ᾽ Ἀφροδίτα.

Apparently a description of Menelaus's despair after his abandonment by Helen, the lines were translated by Robert Browning thus:

"And, through desire of one across the main, A ghost will seem within the house to reign. And hateful to the husband is the grace Of well-shaped statues: from—in place of eyes Those blanks—all Aphrodite dies."

Reception
The film was popular at the British box office.

Awards
Won
 Cannes Film Festival
 Best Actor (Michael Redgrave)
 Best Screenplay
 Berlin International Film Festival
 Bronze Berlin Bear (Drama)
 Small Bronze Plate

Nominated
 Cannes Film Festival – Palme d'Or

See also
 The Browning Version (1994 film), another feature film version starring Albert Finney

References

Bibliography
 Vermilye, Jerry (1978), The Great British Films, Citadel Press, pp 150–152, .

External links
 
 
 
 The Browning Version an essay by Geoffrey Macnab at the Criterion Collection

1951 films
1951 drama films
British drama films
1950s English-language films
British black-and-white films
Films about educators
British films based on plays
Films based on works by Terence Rattigan
Films set in schools
Films shot at Pinewood Studios
Films directed by Anthony Asquith
Films with screenplays by Terence Rattigan
1950s British films